WHKR (102.7 FM, "The Hitkicker") is a commercial FM radio station, licensed to Rockledge, Florida, and serving the Space Coast. It is owned by Cumulus Media and broadcasts a country music radio format.

WHKR has an effective radiated power (ERP) of 50,000 watts.  The transmitter is off Parrish Road in Cocoa West.

History
The station first signed on in 1989.

Previously known as "WHKR 102.7 The Hitkicker", on July 3, 2013, at 3pm, after playing "Parking Lot Party" by Lee Brice, WHKR aired a brief stunt sequence along with the top-of-the-hour station identification.  It then joined Cumulus's nationally growing country brand as "Nash FM 102.7 Melbourne". The first song on "Nash" was Randy Houser's How Country Feels.  It was the first song on all new Nash FM stations up to that point.

On October 5, 2020, WHKR returned to its original branding as "102.7 The Hitkicker."

Previous logo

References

External links

HKR
Cumulus Media radio stations
1989 establishments in Florida
Radio stations established in 1989
Country radio stations in the United States